Ahmed Rabee Saleh Al-Ghilani (Arabic:أحمد ربيع) (born 14 August 1995) is an Emirati footballer. He currently plays for Baniyas as a striker .

External links

References

Emirati footballers
1995 births
Living people
Place of birth missing (living people)
Al Jazira Club players
Baniyas Club players
UAE First Division League players
UAE Pro League players
Association football forwards